WBHS may stand for:
 West Blocton High School in West Blocton, Alabama
 West Boca Raton Community High School in Boca Raton, Florida, United States
 Westlake Boys High School in Auckland, New Zealand
 Whangarei Boys' High School in Whangarei, New Zealand
 Westville Boys' High School in Westville, South Africa
 William Blount High School in Blount County, Tennessee, United States
 William Byrd High School in Roanoke County, Virginia
 Wednesbury Boys' High School in Wednesbury, England
 Wynberg Boys' High School in Cape Town, South Africa
 Whitley Bay High School in Whitley Bay, England
 West Bloomfield High School in West Bloomfield, Michigan, United States
 West Broward High School in west Pembroke Pines, Florida, United States
 Western Branch High School in Chesapeake, Virginia
 WBHS-LP, a low-power radio station (104.9 FM) licensed to Brunswick, Georgia, United States
 WFTT-TV, a television station (50 analog/47 digital) licensed to Tampa, Florida, United States, which used the call signs WBHS or WBHS-TV from November 1987 to November 2001
 WBHS Channel 19, the Educational-access television cable TV Station for Belleville High School in Belleville, Michigan, United States